Patria Plc is a Finnish provider of defence, security and aviation life-cycle support services. Patria is owned 50.1% by the Finnish government and 49.9% by Norwegian defense group Kongsberg Defense & Aerospace AS.

Operating model
In accordance with the new growth strategy Patria's operating model and organisation have been renewed in the beginning of 2022. In the new operating model Patria's target is to utilise all Patria people's competences comprehensively. The operating model with business units (excl. Millog) is dissolved and a unified model consisting of strong core functions – Finland, Global, Portfolio and Operations – were created instead:

Finland Division is responsible for the Finnish accounts with focus on the Finnish Defence Forces. Finland consists of four business areas: Air force, Army, Navy and Joint & Security.

Global Division is responsible for accounts outside Finland. Global consists of market areas Nordics, Europe, and World.

Portfolio is responsible for products and services as well as their development and sales support, consisting of six product and service lines: Fleet Availability, Life cycle management, Training & User Support, C5ISTAR, Mission Capability as well as New Products and Services.

Operations is responsible for production and supply chain consisting of four production lines: Airframe & Structure Operations, Engine, Component & Training Operations, Land Operations and System & Integration Operations.

Highlights
Patria celebrated its 100-year anniversary in 2021. The theme of the anniversary was “The foundation for a secure future”. History provides a strong foundation for a safe future, growth, working together and success.

Patria launched in the beginning of 2022 its new growth strategy which aims at ambitious growth by the end of 2025. Also a new operating model to support the growth strategy was also prepared and was taken into use at the beginning of 2022. Cooperation negotiations covering the whole Patria were conducted in good cooperation between all personnel groups and the company.

The decision on Finland's future F-35 fighter jets in 2021 is a significant opportunity for Patria, and the company has been actively involved in the preparations supporting the Finnish Defence Administration and the HX programme. The main task has been ensuring national security of supply, maintenance of the equipment and meeting industrial cooperation requirements. The fighter procurement decision will also open Patria access to the global F-35 supply chain.

In 2021, Finland and Latvia signed a frame agreement with Patria for a production phase management of the joint 6x6 armoured vehicle system. In addition, Latvia and Patria signed a delivery contract for over 200 6x6 armoured personnel carriers developed in the joint development programme including also support and training systems. The vehicle deliveries will take place between 2021 and 2029. Finland and Patria also signed a letter of intent for Finland's future serial deliveries.

As part of the European Defence Industrial Development Programme (EDIDP), Patria was selected to lead a defence industry consortium developing future armoured platforms and upgrading existing ground combat capabilities in 2021. The consortium comprises 19 leading defence companies from different EU countries.

History
Patria's history begins in 1921 with the establishment of the Finnish Air Force Aircraft Factory at Suomenlinna. The operations begin with licensed manufacturing of the German Hansa-Brandenburg aircraft, with the total production volume between 1922 and 1926 amounting to 120 aircraft. Patria's centenary issue describes the company's history.

During March 2016, it was announced that Norwegian defense group Kongsberg Defense & Aerospace AS had agreed terms to purchase a 49.9% stake in Patria; Walter Qvam, Kongsberg chief executive, stated that the company was keen to leverage new advantages from the deal, including Patria's 50 per cent ownership in Norwegian ammunition manufacturer Nammo. The transaction placed a total value of 283.5 million euros on Patria.

During 2001, Patria had secured contracts to build several elements of the NHIndustries NH90 helicopter, such as the rear fuselage, rear ramp, sponsons and sliding doors; the firm also signed Memorandum of understanding to perform final assembly of both the helicopter and its engines. In March 2008, deliveries of Finland's NH90 commenced; deliveries had been delayed from an initial 2004 date thus, to minimize further delay, helicopters were first delivered to an Initial Operational Configuration (IOC-) and Nearly Operational Configuration (IOC+), to be later modified by Patria into a Final Operational Configuration (FOC). In September 2011, the Finnish Defence Forces and Patria signed an agreement to provide ballistic protection for onboard personnel across the NH90 fleet. On 18 June 2015, delivery of the final Finnish NH90 took place.

Patria has produced components for numerous aircraft manufacturers; it has manufactured elements of the Airbus A380, the world's largest passenger airliner, as well as being a long-term supplier to the Airbus A320 family and the Embraer ERJ-145. Patria has also produced components for multiple programmes headed by the European Space Agency. During late 2004, the company was actively perusing work on Airbus' A350 XWB and A400M Atlas, as well as Boeing's 787.

Patria also provides support and maintenance, repair, and operations (MRO) services for various aircraft. During 2009, it won a contract to modernise the Finnish Air Force's 49 BAE Systems Hawk 51/51As with CMC Electronics's Cockpit 4000 avionics suite; months later, Patria was awarded a second contract to upgrade the avionics of 18 Finnish Hawk 66s. Furthermore, it has made offers to supply and support Hawks for foreign operators, including a bid for the Polish Air Force in 2011. In March 2014, the company partnered with Swiss aerospace company RUAG to offer MRO services to McDonnell Douglas F/A-18 Hornet operators worldwide.

References

Military vehicle manufacturers
Defence companies of Finland
Government-owned companies of Finland
Aircraft manufacturers of Finland
Companies established in 1997
Manufacturing companies based in Helsinki
1997 establishments in Finland